Melanie Ann Hebert (born in Marrero, Louisiana, United States) is an American journalist. She formerly anchored the weekday morning news at the city's NBC affiliate WDSU and anchoring weekday mornings at the CBS affiliate WWL-TV in New Orleans. Hebert has also appeared in several films and TV shows as a news reporter.

Career
Hebert's TV career began behind the scenes in Los Angeles with the entertainment news magazine Extra before she returned to Louisiana to join WVLA-TV, the NBC affiliate in Baton Rouge, as a news anchor and reporter. During this time, she covered Hurricane Katrina and its aftermath and co-anchored a two-week special for the Olympics, "Baton Rouge to Athens", on which she also served as Executive Producer.

Hebert's success in Baton Rouge and the national attention generated by Hurricane Katrina led her to return to California in 2005 where she became the morning and noon anchor for KESQ-TV in Palm Springs. The morning news team received an Emmy Award for the devastating wildfires in California. Hebert returned to New Orleans to produce a one-week special covering the first anniversary of Hurricane Katrina while working at KESQ.

In June 2008, Hebert once more returned to Louisiana to join the WDSU NewsChannel 6 team in New Orleans as the morning anchor.

She has also served as the Director of Publicity for the Baton Rouge Ballet Theatre and has been involved in charity work with Big Brothers Big Sisters, United Way, and Louisiana Amyotrophic Lateral Sclerosis Association.

Education
Melanie Hebert attended St. Mary's Dominican High School and the New Orleans Center for Creative Arts before attending Louisiana State University in Baton Rouge. At LSU she earned a Bachelor of Arts in Mass Communication and was a member and captain of the Golden Girls dance team.

Hebert was crowned the 2001 LSU Homecoming Queen.

Filmography

Film
Green Lantern (2011) - News reporter
Get Hard (2015) - News reporter
The Free World (2016) - News reporter
The Dirt (2019) - MTV VJ

Television
Reckless (2014) - News anchor (ep. 1, "Pilot")
Zoo (2015) - News reporter

References

External links

Living people
Television anchors from New Orleans
Louisiana State University alumni
People from Marrero, Louisiana
Year of birth missing (living people)